Hawley B. Pratt (June 9, 1911 – March 4, 1999) was an American film director, animator, and illustrator. He is best known for his work for Warner Bros. Cartoons and as the right-hand man of director Friz Freleng as a layout artist and later as a director. Pratt also worked for Walt Disney Studios, Filmation, and DePatie-Freleng Enterprises where he co-created The Pink Panther.

Life and career
Born in Seattle and raised in the Bronx by his widowed mother Mabel, Pratt graduated from the Pratt Institute in Brooklyn. He became an artist at Walt Disney Studios in 1933 before joining Warner Bros. Cartoons, along with fellow animators Bill Melendez, Maurice Noble, Cornett Wood, and Jack Bradbury after the Disney animators' strike in 1941.At Warners, he served as a layout artist providing background layouts and character poses from 1945 to the early 1960s. Working closely with director Friz Freleng, Pratt's Warner Bros. resume includes the Oscar-winning cartoons Tweetie Pie, which introduced the duo of Sylvester and Tweety, Speedy Gonzales, where Freleng and Pratt redesigned the character into his modern incarnation, and Birds Anonymous. Pratt directed Señorella and the Glass Huarache, a Looney Tune released in 1964 after the studio closed its animation division.

Pratt briefly worked at the Hanna-Barbera studio with Freleng before the two moved to DePatie-Freleng Enterprises. They created the Pink Panther character for the animated title sequence of the 1963 feature film of the same name; though, Pratt is often solely credited for the character's creation. While there, he directed (or co-directed) all episodes of The Pink Panther Show. Pratt made his directorial effort in the 1966 short The Pink Blueprint, which received an Oscar nomination for Best Short Subject (Cartoon). His other directorial works also include three Roland and Rattfink shorts, The Super 6, and three Dr. Seuss television specials: The Cat in the Hat and Dr. Seuss on the Loose, and The Lorax. Pratt also served as associate director and animator of the 1964 film The Incredible Mr. Limpet. Hawley Pratt's last design credit was on Jetsons: The Movie in 1990.

Pratt's skills also had him illustrating several Little Golden Books and Big Golden Books.

Pratt died on March 4, 1999.

Awards
 Golden Award 1992

References

External links
 
 The Man Behind the Pencil

1911 births
1999 deaths
American film directors
American animated film directors
American animators
American illustrators
Walt Disney Animation Studios people
Hanna-Barbera people
Artists from Seattle
Pratt Institute alumni
Warner Bros. Cartoons directors